Johannes Dale (born 23 May 1997) is a Norwegian biathlete. He competed at the Biathlon World Championships 2020.

Biathlon results
All results are sourced from the International Biathlon Union.

World Championships
2 medals (2 silver, 1 bronze)

World Cup

Individual podiums
 1 victory - (1 Sp) 
 6 podiums - (2 Sp, 2 Pu, 1 In, 1 Ms)

References

External links

1997 births
Living people
Norwegian male biathletes
People from Lørenskog
Biathlon World Championships medalists
Sportspeople from Viken (county)